Wilfred Bailey Everett Bixby III (January 22, 1934 – November 21, 1993) professionally known as Bill Bixby, was an American actor, director, producer, and frequent game-show panellist.

Bixby's career spanned more than three decades, including appearances on stage, in films, and on television series. He is known for his roles in the CBS sitcom My Favorite Martian as Tim O'Hara, in the ABC sitcom The Courtship of Eddie's Father as Tom Corbett, in the NBC crime drama series The Magician as stage Illusionist Anthony Blake, and the CBS science-fiction drama series The Incredible Hulk as Dr. David Banner.

Early life
An only child, Bixby was born Wilfred Bailey Everett Bixby III, a fourth-generation Californian of English descent, on January 22, 1934, in San Francisco, California. His father, Wilfred Bailey Everett Bixby II, was a store clerk. His mother, Jane (née McFarland) Bixby, was a senior manager at I. Magnin & Co. In 1942, when Bixby was eight years old, his father enlisted in the Navy during World War II and traveled to the South Pacific. While in the seventh grade, Bixby attended Grace Cathedral and sang in the church's choir. In one notable incident, he shot the bishop using a slingshot during a service and was kicked out of the choir. In 1946, his mother encouraged him to take ballroom dance lessons and from there he started dancing all around the city. While dancing, he attended Lowell High School, where he perfected his oratory and dramatic skills as a member of the Lowell Forensic Society. Though he received average grades, he also competed in high-school speech tournaments regionally.

After graduation from high school in 1952, against his parents' wishes, he majored in drama at City College of San Francisco.

During the Korean War, Bixby was drafted shortly after his 18th birthday. Rather than report to the United States Army, Bixby joined the United States Marine Corps Reserve. He served primarily in personnel management with Marine Attack Squadron 141 (VMA-141) at Naval Air Station Oakland, and attained the rank of private first class before his 1956 discharge.

Later, he attended the University of California, Berkeley, his parents' alma mater, and left just a few credits short of earning a degree. He then moved to Hollywood, California, where he had a string of odd jobs that included bellhop and lifeguard. He organized shows at a resort in Jackson Hole, Wyoming, and in 1959 was hired to work as a model and to do commercial work for General Motors and Chrysler.

Career

Beginning acting
In 1961, Bixby was in the musical The Boy Friend at the Detroit Civic Theater, returning to Hollywood to make his television debut on an episode of The Many Loves of Dobie Gillis. He became a highly regarded character actor and guest-starred in many television series, including Ben Casey, The Twilight Zone, The Andy Griffith Show, Dr. Kildare, Straightaway, and Hennesey. He also joined the cast of The Joey Bishop Show in 1962. In 1963, he played a sailor with a Napoleon tattoo in the movie Irma La Douce, a romantic comedy starring Jack Lemmon and Shirley MacLaine, directed by Billy Wilder based on the 1956 French musical. During the 1970s, he made guest appearances on television series such as Ironside, Insight, Barbary Coast, The Love Boat, Medical Center, four episodes of Love, American Style, Fantasy Island, and two episodes each of The Streets of San Francisco and Rod Serling's Night Gallery.

My Favorite Martian and other early roles

Bixby took the role of young reporter Tim O'Hara in the 1963 CBS sitcom, My Favorite Martian, in which he co-starred with Ray Walston. By 1966, though, high production costs forced the series to come to an end after 107 episodes. After its cancellation, Bixby starred in four movies: Ride Beyond Vengeance, Doctor, You've Got to Be Kidding!, and two of Elvis Presley's movies, Clambake and Speedway. He turned down the role as Marlo Thomas's boyfriend in the successful That Girl, though he later guest-starred in the show, and starred in two failed pilots.

The Courtship of Eddie's Father
In 1969, Bixby starred in his second high-profile television role, as Tom Corbett in The Courtship of Eddie's Father, a comedy drama on ABC. The series concerned a widowed father raising a young son, managing a major syndicated magazine, and at the same time trying to re-enter the dating scene. This series was in the vein of other 1960s and 1970s sitcoms that dealt with widowerhood, such as The Andy Griffith Show and My Three Sons. Eddie was played by novice actor Brandon Cruz. The pair developed a close rapport that translated to an off-camera friendship, as well. The core cast was rounded out by Academy Award-winning actress Miyoshi Umeki, who played the role of Tom's housekeeper, Mrs. Livingston, James Komack (one of the series' producers) as Norman Tinker, Tom's pseudo-hippie, quirky photographer, and actress Kristina Holland as Tom's secretary, Tina. One episode of the series co-starred Bixby's future wife, Brenda Benet, as one of Tom's girlfriends.

Bixby was nominated for the Emmy Award for Lead Actor in a Comedy Series in 1971. The following year, he won the Parents Without Partners Exemplary Service Award for 1972.

Bixby made his directorial debut on the sitcom in 1970, directing eight episodes. ABC cancelled the sitcom in 1972 at the end of season three.

After the show was cancelled, Bixby and Cruz remained in contact, with Cruz making a guest appearance on Bixby's later series The Incredible Hulk. The death of Bixby's only child, in 1981, drew Bixby and Cruz closer still. The two remained in touch until Bixby's death in 1993. In 1995, Cruz named his own son Lincoln Bixby Cruz.

Brandon Cruz said of the show that developed a professional father-son relationship, compared to that of The Andy Griffith Show, "We dealt with issues that were talked about, but were never brought up on television. Bill wasn't the first actor to portray a single widowed father, but he became one of the popular ones, because of his easy-going way of this crazy little kid." Prior to Bixby's promotion to director, Brandon said, "He was looking for the best dolly grip, along with the boom operator that if something was called specifically and failed, Bill could be easily angry." On the kind of relationship Bill had wanted with his co-star, Brandon also said, "Bill would never speak down to me. Bill treated me as an equal. He made sure that we had a lot of time together, just so he could kinda crawl inside my head and see what actually made a kid tick." Upon the death of Bill's real-life father in 1971, Cruz stated, "He had that type of mentality that the show must go on, thinking it was just a great TV show, after he broke down weeping."

In a 2011 interview with Marilyn Beck and Stacy Jenel Smith about how Bill Bixby's fame was supposed to posthumously honor him for a star on the Hollywood Walk of Fame, Cruz said, "When I found out they were putting this out, I thought, 'It's about time.' Bill Bixby had an amazing body of work, not only Courtship of Eddie's Father, but My Favorite Martian, The Magician, The Incredible Hulk, and so many other things, as an actor, as a director — and he never got an Emmy. He's never been recognized posthumously by the Academy. And he doesn't have a star on the Hollywood Walk of Fame. That is criminal.... There are people who have stars that, not to be blunt, but I wouldn't bother spitting on their stars. Bill's talent would take a couple of blocks of stars compared to them. It really demeans the whole thing that Bill is not included."

1973 to 1977
In 1973, Bixby starred in The Magician. The series was well liked, but lasted for only one season. An accomplished amateur magician himself, he hosted several TV specials in the mid-1970s which featured other amateur magicians, and was a respected member of the Hollywood magic community, belonging to The Magic Castle, an exclusive club for magicians. During the show's popular, although short-lived, production, Bixby invited a few old friends along to co-star such as Pamela Britton (in her final role), Kristina Holland, and Ralph O'Hara.

Also in 1973, he starred in Steambath, a play by author Bruce Jay Friedman, on PBS with Valerie Perrine and Jose Perez.

Bixby became a popular game-show panelist, appearing mostly on Password and The Hollywood Squares. He was also a panelist on the 1974 revival of Masquerade Party, which was hosted by Richard Dawson. He had also appeared with Dawson on Cop-Out. In 1974–1975, he directed four episodes of the eighth season of Mannix, guest-starring as Mannix's friend-turned-villain in one of the episodes.

In 1975, he co-starred with Tim Conway and Don Knotts in the Disney movie The Apple Dumpling Gang, which was well received by the public.

Returning to television, Bixby worked with Susan Blakely on Rich Man, Poor Man, a highly successful television miniseries in 1976. He played a daredevil stunt pilot in an episode of the short-lived 1976 CBS adventure series Spencer's Pilots, starring Gene Evans. In 1977, he co-starred in the pilot for the television series Fantasy Island; starred in "No Way Out", the final episode of the NBC anthology series Quinn Martin's Tales of the Unexpected (known in the United Kingdom as Twist in the Tale); and appeared with Donna Mills, Richard Jaeckel, and William Shatner in the last episode, "The Scarlet Ribbon", of NBC's Western series The Oregon Trail, starring Rod Taylor and Andrew Stevens. Bixby directed two episodes of The Oregon Trail.

In 1976, he was honored with two Emmy Award nominations, one for Outstanding Lead Actor for a Single Appearance in Drama or Comedy for The Streets of San Francisco and the other for Outstanding Single Performance by a Supporting Actor in Comedy or Drama Series for Rich Man, Poor Man.

Bixby hosted Once Upon a Classic on PBS from 1976 to 1980.

The Incredible Hulk

Bixby starred in the role of Dr. David Banner in the pilot movie, The Incredible Hulk, based on the Stan Lee and Jack Kirby Marvel characters. Kenneth Johnson, the creator, director, and writer, said that Bixby was his only choice to play the part. Although, reportedly, when Bixby was offered the role, he declined it – until he read the script and discussed it with Johnson. The success of the pilot (coupled with some theatrical releases of the film in Europe) convinced CBS to turn it into a weekly series, which began airing in the spring of 1978. The pilot also starred Susan Sullivan as Dr. Elaina Marks, who tries to help the conflicted and widowed Dr. Banner overcome his "problem", and falls in love with him in the process. In a retrospective on The Incredible Hulk, Glenn Greenberg declared Bixby's performance to be the series's "foremost" strength, elaborating that he "masterfully conveyed the profound loneliness and tragedy of Dr. Banner while also bringing to the role an abundance of warmth, intelligence, humor, nobility, likability, and above all else, humanity."

During the series' run, Bixby invited two of his longtime friends, Ray Walston and Brandon Cruz, to guest-star with him in different episodes of the series. He also worked on the series with his friend, movie actress Mariette Hartley, who later starred with Bixby in his final series, Goodnight, Beantown, in 1983. Hartley appears in the well-regarded double-length episode "Married", and subsequently won an Emmy Award for her guest appearance. Future star Loni Anderson also guest-starred with Bixby during the first season. Bixby directed one episode of the series, "Bring Me the Head of the Hulk", in 1980 (original airdate: January 9, 1981). The series was cancelled after the following season, but leftover episodes aired as late as the next June. Bixby later executive-produced and reprised the role in three television movies – The Incredible Hulk Returns, The Trial of the Incredible Hulk, and The Death of the Incredible Hulk – the last two of which he also directed, and the first of which he has been said to have unofficially co-directed.

Later work
Bixby was executive producer and co-star of the short-lived sitcom Goodnight, Beantown (1983–84). He also directed three episodes of the series. During the same time, Bixby directed several episodes of another short-lived television series, Wizards and Warriors, which aired in 1983. From 1983 to 1984, he hosted a documentary series for Nickelodeon entitled Against the Odds. The series, which was cancelled after only two seasons, consists of short biographies of famous people throughout history. From 1986 to 1987, he hosted the syndicated weekday anthology series True Confessions. In 1987, he directed eight episodes of the satirical police sitcom Sledge Hammer!, including the episode "Hammer Hits the Rock" in season two, where he made an uncredited appearance as Zeke.

Bixby hosted two specials regarding Elvis conspiracy theories and his alleged sightings: The Elvis Files (1991) and The Elvis Conspiracy (1992).

Bixby made his last acting appearance in 1992, guest-starring in the television movie Diagnosis Murder: Diagnosis of Murder.

He finished his career by directing 30 episodes (in seasons two and three) of the NBC sitcom Blossom.

Personal life
Bixby's first marriage was to actress Brenda Benet. They were married in 1971, and she gave birth to their son, Christopher, in September 1974. They divorced in 1980. A few months later, in March 1981, six-year-old Christopher died while on a skiing vacation at Mammoth Lakes with Benet. He went into cardiac arrest after doctors inserted a breathing tube when he suffered acute epiglottitis. Benet committed suicide the following year.

Bixby met Laura Michaels, who had worked on the set of one of his Hulk movies, in 1989. They married a year later in Hawaii. In early 1991, he was diagnosed with prostate cancer and underwent treatment. He was divorced in the same year.

In late 1992, friends introduced Bixby to the artist Judith Kliban, widow of the cartoonist B. Kliban. He married her in October 1993, just six weeks before he collapsed on the set of Blossom.

In early 1993, after rumors began circulating about his health, Bixby went public with his illness, and made several appearances on shows such as Entertainment Tonight, Today, and Good Morning America, among others.

Death
On November 21, 1993, seven days after his final assignment on Blossom, Bixby died of complications from prostate cancer in Century City, Los Angeles. He was 59 years old.

Filmography

Film

Television

Production credits

Television

References

External links

 
 
 
 
 

1934 births
1993 deaths
20th-century American businesspeople
20th-century American male actors
American male film actors
American male stage actors
American male television actors
American people of English descent
American television directors
City College of San Francisco alumni
Deaths from cancer in California
Deaths from prostate cancer
Film directors from California
Male actors from San Francisco
Television personalities from San Francisco
Television producers from California
United States Marine Corps reservists
United States Marines
University of California, Berkeley alumni